Peeblesshire was a Scottish county constituency of the House of Commons of the Parliament of the United Kingdom (Westminster) from 1708 until 1868. It elected one Member of Parliament (MP) by the first past the post voting system.

Creation
The British parliamentary constituency was created in 1708 following the Acts of Union, 1707 and replaced the former Parliament of Scotland shire constituency of Peeblesshire.

Boundaries

The name relates the constituency to the county of Peebles. Article XII of the Union with Scotland Act 1706 (Act settling the Manner of electing the Representatives of Scotland), provided that one representative should be chosen for every shire and steuartry (except for some shires which were to take turns).

History
The constituency elected one Member of Parliament (MP) by the first past the post system until the seat was abolished for the 1868 general election.

This arrangement was continued by the Representation of the People (Scotland) Act 1832.

The Representation of the People (Scotland) Act 1868 abolished the rights of the counties of Peebles and Selkirk to return a member, and provided that those counties should jointly return a member, thereby establishing the Peebles and Selkirk constituency.

Members of Parliament

Election results

Elections in the 1830s

Montgomery resigned, causing a by-election.

Montgomery's death caused a by-election.

Elections in the 1840s

Mackenzie was appointed a Lord Commissioner of the Treasury, requiring a by-election.

Elections in the 1850s

Elections in the 1860s

Graham-Montgomery was appointed a Lord Commissioner of the Treasury, requiring a by-election.

References 

Historic parliamentary constituencies in Scotland (Westminster)
Peeblesshire
Constituencies of the Parliament of the United Kingdom established in 1708
Constituencies of the Parliament of the United Kingdom disestablished in 1868